Shenzhen (167) is a Type 051B destroyer of the People's Liberation Army Navy. She was commissioned in February 1999.

Development and design 

The Shenzhen was intended to be an experimental vessel with improvements over the Luhu-class' in terms of modular construction and stealth. The ship is powered by two indigenous steam turbine engines.

The main purpose of the Type 051B was to gain experience in modern naval ship design and construction, and refining the knowledge and skills accumulated from the earlier Type 052, such as integrating many different foreign subsystems on the Type 052 more effectively.

Construction and career 
Shenzhen was launched on 16 October 1997 at the Dalian Shipyard in Dalian. Commissioned in 1999.

Shenzhen participated in the PLA Navy's first goodwill visit to Africa in 2000

Also the first visit to Europe in 2001 and the first visit to Japan in 2007.

In 2004, she received its mid-life modernization refit, with its original 100mm main gun and the HQ-7 air defense missile system being replaced by improved models.

Type 051B destroyer 167 Shenzhen visited Kochi, India for four days in August 2009, after deployment in the Gulf of Aden on anti-piracy operations.

In early 2015, she was spotted at the Zhanjiang naval base undergoing work. Initially it was unclear whether this was due to a midlife refit program or decommissioning, but pictures revealed in January 2016 that the ship was being refitted with new systems. For self-defense, the four old Type 76A 37 mm AA guns were replaced with two H/PJ-11 eleven-barreled 30 mm CIWS (export designation Type 1130), one covering each side.

In May 2020, it was revealed that the Type 051B had its YJ-83 subsonic ASMs replaced with 16 supersonic YJ-12 missiles.

Gallery

References 

1997 ships
Ships built in China
Type 051B destroyers